Enkelejd Pengu or Ledio Pengu  (born 23 May 1986 in Pogradec) is an Albanian footballer who played for KS Pogradeci in the Albanian First Division.

References

External links
 Profile - FSHF

1986 births
Living people
People from Pogradec
Association football forwards
Albanian footballers
KS Pogradeci players
KF Gramshi players
Kategoria e Parë players